Sergio Gonzalo Rodríguez Budes (born 5 January 1985 in Montevideo) is an Uruguayan footballer that currently plays for Danubio.

External links
 Profile at TenfieldDigital.com 
 
 
 

1985 births
Living people
Uruguayan footballers
Uruguayan expatriate footballers
Association football defenders
Uruguayan Primera División players
Argentine Primera División players
Primera Nacional players
Danubio F.C. players
Quilmes Atlético Club footballers
Rosario Central footballers
Montevideo Wanderers F.C. players
Maccabi Tel Aviv F.C. players
Club Atlético Belgrano footballers
Baniyas Club players
Atlético Tucumán footballers
Instituto footballers
Independiente Rivadavia footballers
Atlético de Rafaela footballers
Uruguayan expatriate sportspeople in Israel
Uruguayan expatriate sportspeople in Argentina
Uruguayan expatriate sportspeople in the United Arab Emirates
Expatriate footballers in Israel
Expatriate footballers in Argentina
Expatriate footballers in the United Arab Emirates